The South Africa national soccer team played their first international in 1906, and were founder members of the Confederation of African Football in 1956, but due to their apartheid system were banned from the confederation in 1958 and from FIFA in 1976. The South Africa national team was readmitted to both following the end of apartheid and its only major honour came in 1996 when it won the Africa Cup of Nations.

List

References

 
South Africa
Association football player non-biographical articles